Wacko is a 1983 arcade game by Bally Midway. It featured a unique angled cabinet design and a combination of trackball and joystick controls.

The player assumes the role of Kapt'n Krooz'r, a small, green alien within a bubble-topped spaceship who also appears in the game Kozmik Krooz'r. The goal of each level is to eliminate the monsters, accomplished by shooting twin pairs in succession. As the player progresses, shooting monsters out of order creates mutants that must be unmatched before they can be eliminated.

Gameplay
The player moves Kapt'n Krooz'r with the trackball and fires in four directions using either joystick. Shooting a single monster stuns it for a few seconds. The player must then shoot the monster's twin before the first one recovers in order to eliminate the pair.

On later boards, shooting a different monster results in the two becoming mutants – the head of one joins with the torso of the other, and vice versa. To eliminate these mutants, the player must either unmix them by shooting the same pair again, or produce a second set of mutants which can then be paired up with the first. Eliminating a pair of mutants is worth more points than eliminating a pair of non-mutants.

As the player advances from board to board, the following additional transformations appear, introduced one at a time:

Matched pairs of large monsters become tiny and fly around the screen
Tiny monsters turn into eggs and run around
Eggs turn into bats
Some large monsters start as mutants 

Each new form requires only one shot to be either destroyed or changed into the next one. All monsters on the screen must be turned into the next form before any of them can be destroyed or further transformed.

Legacy
Wacko is available as a part of two compilations of arcade games: Midway Arcade Treasures 2, for the GameCube, PlayStation 2, and Xbox; and Midway Arcade Treasures Deluxe Edition for the PC.

Steve Harris of Missouri, USA, scored a world record 1,608,100 points playing Wacko at the NKC Pro Bowl in Kansas City, Missouri, USA, on March 31, 1983.

Weirdo is a 1987 clone for the TRS-80 Color Computer.

Notes

External links 
 

1983 video games
Action video games
Arcade video games
Midway video games
Trackball video games
Video games about extraterrestrial life
Video games developed in the United States